Stanley Philip Friedman (February 3, 1925 – July 14, 2006) was an American author and photographer based in New York City.

World War II
Friedman was born in Seattle and attended Garfield High School. He enlisted in the US Army Air Corps during World War II,  as a 2nd Lieutenant. He became a bombardier, first of B-24, and then B-17, aircraft, and flew 36 missions over Belgium, France, Holland, and Germany in the 861st Bomb Squadron, 493d Bombardment Group, 3rd Bomb Division, Eighth Air Force.

After his tour in the European Theater of Operations, he gained his commission and trained to become a pilot. He was released from the Air Corps at the convenience of the Army on 17 October 1945, after the war's end.  For his service in operations over Normandy, the Rhineland, and the Ardennes, he received the Air Medal with one silver cluster.

Photography
After the war, Friedman took a degree in English Literature from the University of Washington. He then moved to New York City, where he began shooting hundreds of photos in his spare time. He also worked in the photo department of United Press International from 1960 to 1981. Many of the prints appeared in prominent newspapers, including a widely circulated photo showing Friedman's wife Jean and his small son Nick expressing surprise at a seemingly broken water fountain's suddenly springing to life.  Another photo, one of Henry Cabot Lodge, Jr., former U.S. Ambassador to the United Nations, and his wife on a bench in Central Park, appeared on the front page of the New York Herald Tribune.

Writing
After an incident where Friedman, attempting a nature shot while perched precariously on a log over a stream, fell and doused himself and his camera, he focused his efforts primarily on writing. He wrote four books: The Magnificent Kennedy Women, Ronald Reagan: His Life Story in Pictures, The Kennedy Family Scrapbook, and under the pseudonym Ike Macgillicuddy, True Quotes.  Friedman was also photo editor of Robert MacNeil's  book, The Way We Were: 1963, The Year Kennedy Was Shot.

Friedman wrote articles freelance for The New York Times, New York, Esquire, National Lampoon, and the Village Voice.  He conceived of a layout for a 1981 Esquire article "Got the Picture?", which went on to win a national design award. It consisted of a two-page spread containing empty rectangles where photos might logically appear, under which captions written by Friedman described famous events in modern history that were so prominent in the public mind that many swore they had seen the photographs, though none existed. Among them: Nikita Khrushchev using his shoe as a gavel on the dais during a U.N. speech and Babe Ruth pointing to center field in the 1932 World Series prior to hitting a home run there.

Death
Friedman vowed to pursue his writing career "until they find me dead at the keyboard."  True to his word, his end came just a few feet away from his computer, in his sleep, on July 14, 2006.  The screen contained a poem Friedman was composing.

He was buried, as per his wishes, with a cup of coffee and a New York Times in his coffin. His epitaph: "Fifty Years on the Writer's Rock Pile."

Works
 
 ,

Notes

References

  
 
 "The Kennedy Family Scrapbook." Publishers Weekly, 25 Dec. 1978, p. 57 
 "The Kennedy family scrapbook." Library Journal, 15 Feb. 1979, p. 486.
 

1925 births
2006 deaths
Writers from Seattle
United States Army Air Forces officers
20th-century American photographers
Burials at Westchester Hills Cemetery
Recipients of the Air Medal
20th-century American male writers